Maqam, makam, maqaam or maqām (plural maqāmāt) may refer to:

Musical structures 
 Arabic maqam, melodic modes in traditional Arabic music
 Iraqi maqam, a genre of Arabic maqam music found in Iraq
 Persian maqam, a notion in Persian classical music
 Turkish makam, a Turkish system of melody types
 List of Turkish makams
 Muqam, a melody type from Uyghur culture
 Mugham, a music tradition of Azerbaijani cultures
 Shashmaqam ("six maqams"), a musical genre typical of Tajikistan and Uzbekistan
 Weekly Maqam, melody types used in weekly prayer services of Sephardic Jewish culture

Individual maqamat
Hijaz (maqam)
Rast (maqam)

Other uses
 Maqam (shrine), a tomb of a Muslim holy person
 Maqam (Sufism), any spiritual stage in the Sufi path
 Maqam, Iran, a village in Hormozgan Province, Iran
 Al-Maqam Mosque, Basra, Iraq
 MAQAM, a US-based production company specializing in Arabic and Middle Eastern media

See also